Rope, retitled Rope's End for its American release, is a 1929 English play by Patrick Hamilton. It was said to be inspired by the real-life murder of 14-year-old Bobby Franks in 1924 by University of Chicago students Nathan Leopold and Richard Loeb.

In formal terms, it is a well-made play with a three-act dramatic structure that adheres to the classical unities. Its action is continuous, punctuated only by the curtain fall at the end of each act. It may also be considered a thriller. Samuel French published the play in 1929.

Plot and setting

The play is set on the first floor of a house in Mayfair, London in 1929. The story concerns two young university students, Wyndham Brandon and Charles Granillo (whom Brandon calls "Granno"), who have murdered fellow student Ronald Kentley as an expression of their supposed intellectual superiority. At the beginning of the play, they hide Kentley's body in a chest. They proceed to host a party for his friends and family at which the locked chest containing his corpse is used to serve a buffet. Suspicion arises among the guests as to the content of the chest. After the party, one guest, a former professor of the murderers, returns and contrives to open the chest. He is shocked and ashamed that they have acted in response to his own declarations of amorality. The play ends with this quandary unresolved.

Production history

Rope was first presented by The Repertory Players in a Sunday night try-out production at the Strand Theatre, London, on 3 March 1929. The following month the play opened in the West End at the Ambassadors Theatre on 25 April 1929. The production ran for six months. Retitled Rope's End, the first Broadway production opened at the John Golden Theatre (then called the Theatre Masque) on 13 September 1929. On 16 December 2009, a revival of Rope began at the Almeida Theatre in London, in a production directed by Roger Michell.

The 1929 London productions

Strand Theatre
 Wyndham Brandon - Sebastian Shaw
 Charles Granillo - Anthony Ireland
 Sabot - Frederick Burtwell
 Kenneth Raglan - Hugh Dempster
 Leila Arden - Betty Schuster
 Sir Johnstone Kentley - Daniel Roe
 Mrs Debenham - Ruth Taylor
 Rupert Cadell - Robert Holmes

Ambassadors' Theatre
 Wyndham Brandon - Brian Aherne
 Charles Granillo - Anthony Ireland
 Sabot - Stafford Hilliard
 Kenneth Raglan - Patrick Waddington
 Leila Arden - Lilian Oldland
 Sir Johnstone Kentley - Paul Gill
 Mrs Debenham - Alix Frizell
 Rupert Cadell - Ernest Milton

Directed by Reginald Denham.

The 1929 Broadway production
 Charles Granillo - Ivan Brandt
 Leila Arden - Margaret Delamere
 Kenneth Raglan - Hugh Dempster
 Sir Johnstone Kentley - Samuels Lysons
 Rupert Cadell - Ernest Milton
 Mrs. Debenham - Nora Nicholson
 Wyndham Brandon - Sebastian Shaw
 Sabot - John Trevor

Directed by Reginald Denham

Film and TV adaptations
The play was first broadcast on experimental live television by the BBC, on 8 March 1939. It was adapted by Hamilton, produced by Dallas Bower, and used long takes. Director Alfred Hitchcock later said he saw (or heard about) the long takes of this television production and was inspired to attempt a feature film version. Another version was broadcast on the British commercial network ITV in 1957. In different roles, Dennis Price appeared in both versions. A version was made for Australian television in 1959, and aired as part of the series Shell Presents. A different version for Australian television aired in 1957.

In Alfred Hitchcock's 1948 film version, Rope, Hitchcock, Hume Cronyn, and Arthur Laurents made some changes to the original stage play. The setting is relocated to the 1940s New York City and the names of all of the characters, with the exception of Rupert Cadell, are altered. Quiet Mrs. Debenham became cheerful Mrs. Atwater. The murder victim is renamed David Kentley. In the original play, Rupert Cadell is a 29-year-old First World War veteran, who walks with a stick. He was a teacher of Brandon and Granillo when they were at school. In the film, Cadell is played by James Stewart, who was forty at the time. In this version, Cadell had been the teacher of Brandon Shaw, Philip Morgan, Kenneth Lawrence, and David Kentley, and is currently a publisher. Hitchcock's is the only feature film version of the play to-date.

In 1983, Rope was dramatised as a BBC Radio 4 Drama for Saturday Night Theatre, starring Alan Rickman as Cadell.

References

External links 
 
 1939 BBC TV version at IMDB
1952 Best Plays radio adaptation of play at Internet Archive
 1957 ITV version at IMDB

1929 plays
Plays by Patrick Hamilton
Plays set in London
Plays based on real people
British plays adapted into films
Cultural depictions of Leopold and Loeb
West End plays